Vrabče is a village in the Municipality of Sežana in the traditional Inner Carniola region of Slovenia. It is now generally regarded as part of the Slovenian Littoral.

References

External links

Vrabče on Geopedia

Populated places in the Municipality of Sežana